The Kai Tak Development, abbreviated as "KTD" and formerly called South East Kowloon Development, refers to the redevelopment of the former Kai Tak Airport site in Kai Tak, Kowloon, Hong Kong.

After the airport relocated to Chek Lap Kok in 1998, the Hong Kong government planned for urban development on the old airport site. The plan also covered nearby development in areas including Ma Tau Wai, Kowloon City, San Po Kong, Kowloon Bay and Kwun Tong.

The planned population is 86,000 people, accommodated in 30,000 housing units, including 13,000 constructed as part of public housing estates. The total cost for the development is about HK$100 billion.

After several years of planning and discussion, and the decision of a judicial review on Central and Wan Chai Reclamation, the Hong Kong government restarted KTD review and planning in 2004. The Executive Council passed the revised development plan and restarted the project. According to the development plan, the first stage projects finished in or before 2013. The second stage projects will be finished in or before 2016 and the final stage projects will be completed in or before 2021.

History

1980s
The Hong Kong colonial government commissioned the "Study on Harbour Reclamations and Urban Growth" in October 1983. It was a study for a proposed plan to address the urban development of Hong Kong. The government worked on the "Metroplan Selected Strategy" study between 1987 and 1990. Its purpose was to provide a wide-ranging plan for urban renewal-focused land-use, transport and environmental planning. The studied areas included West Kowloon, Kai Tak and other regions. The study was passed by the Executive Council on 17September 1991. Afterwards, related government departments implemented the strategy according to the study.

1990s
In 1998, the Planning Department undertook several studies on East Kowloon development. After several modifications, the land reclamation plan and the population plan were altered considerably.

South East Kowloon Development Statement (June 1992-1993) 
This plan proposed the development of Kai Tak as a "City Within a City", covering , including  of reclaimed land. It proposed land development for residential, commercial and industrial use. The designated population of this new town was around 285,000. The development would also include a  park and a  promenade. The proposed development included two MTR connections, with Diamond Hill and Kwun Tong.

Feasibility Study for South East Kowloon Development (September 1995-1998) 
The study refocused the development as a "City Within a City" with territorial facilities. The site area and reclamation provisions remained the same as in the previous proposal. It was also the first plan to propose leisure facilities, such as a multi-purpose sports complex and aviation museum. Other facilities, including a hospital, rail yard, and post office were proposed. The MTR provisions were replaced by the Sha Tin to Central Link.

2000s

Comprehensive Feasibility Study for the Revised Scheme of South East Kowloon Development (November 1999-2003) 
The study re-designated the Kai Tak Development as an "Environmentally Friendly City". The new designated population is 26,0000. It also first proposed a cruise terminal. The MTR-centric strategy continued in the study, with the new Environmentally Friendly Linkage System proposal.

In June 2002, the Executive Council of Hong Kong approved Outline Zoning Plans (S/K19/3 and S/K21/3) for Kai Tak (North) and Kai Tak (South). Major development projects included the MTR Sha Tin to Central Link depot on the original airport site, a multi-use stadium, a metro park, the Kai Tak Cruise Terminal with helicopter landing site at the end of former runway, and the Central Kowloon Route. A new road: Trunk Road T2, paralleling the Kwun Tong Bypass, will be built within the development area, allowing traffic to go directly to Tseung Kwan O through the Tseung Kwan O - Lam Tin Tunnel.

However, on 27 February 2003, the non-government organisation Society for Protection of the Harbour applied for Judicial Review against the Town Planning Board. The Society believed that the Wan Chai Development Phase II would violate the Protection of the Harbour Ordinance. The High Court's final judgement is against the Town Planning Board. The reclamation plan was suspended. The High Court's judgement raised three tests had to be satisfied for reclamation:
there had to be a compelling, overriding and present public need which clearly outweighed the public need to protect the harbour;
there had to be no other alternative to implement the undertaking for which it was proposed, and
that any invasion of the harbour should be restricted to the minimum impairment necessary to implement the undertaking.

This judgement affected the reclamation plan within Kai Tak Development. In order to satisfy the three tests, the new Harbour-front Enhancement Committee was established for consultation on the reclamation in Wan Chai and Kai Tak. The committee, led by chairman Lee Chack-fan, was organised by six government officials and twenty-three members from different professional organisations, environmental organisations, harbour protection organisations and business merchants.

Kai Tak Planning Review (July 2004-2006) 
Due to the High Court judgement, the Planning Department began the Kai Tak Planning Review with "no reclamation" as its principle. This was the final plan.

Proposed development timeline

The first stage infrastructure projects are mostly completed and open. These are the first stage projects:
Trade and Industry Tower (completed 2015)
Kai Tak Fire Station (completed)
Kai Tak Cruise Terminal building and first berth (completed)
Kwun Tong Promenade (completed)
Kai Tak Runway Park (completed)
District Cooling System (first phase) (completed)
Kai Ching Estate 
Tak Long Estate

The second stage infrastructure projects were expected to completed after 2016. These are the second stage projects:

Kai Tak Cruise Terminal: second berth, helicopter landing zone and Tourist Centre (expected to be complete July 2014)
MTR Tuen Ma line Kai Tak station (construction began 2012, completed in 2020)
Route 6 (Central Kowloon Route and Trunk Road T2) (under consultation) 
Underground street to Kowloon City and San Po Kong
Kai Tak River (expected to be finished in phases between 2015 and 2018)
District Cooling System (second phase)
Hospital: Hong Kong Children's Hospital (construction began in 2014, completed in 2017) and Centre of Excellence in Neuroscience
Kai Tak Sky Garden, a massive elevated garden, opened in May 2021. It occupies part of the former runway and apron.
Several private residential developments including:
Oasis Kai Tak
One Kai Tak
Vibe Centro
Victoria Skye

The final stage infrastructure projects are expected to completed after 2021. These are the final stage projects:
Kai Tak Sports Park (expected to be completed by 2023)
Environmentally Friendly Linkage System (EFLS) (Put on Hold)
Metro Park
Remaining residential and commercial land at north apron
commercial land at south apron
District Cooling System (third phase)

Transport

MTR Tuen Ma line

The Tuen Ma line involves construction of two stations within the KTD: Kai Tak station and Sung Wong Toi station.

Environmentally Friendly Linkage System

The Environmentally Friendly Linkage System (EFLS) is a monorail transportation system with 12 stations proposed by the government. It will cost around 1.2 billion Hong Kong dollars. The estimated passenger count in up to 200,000 in 2031. The system will account for 15 percent of the public transportation in the Kowloon East Development. The EFLS project is now headed by the Development Bureau with public consultation carried out by the Civil Engineering and Development Department. Construction is predicted to start in 2018 and to be completed in 2023.

There is opposition to the monorail system and other proposing a tram system (using Ground-level power supply) as a more feasible alternative.

Highway and roads
Hong Kong's Route 6 is proposed to cross the KTD area, using the Central Kowloon Route, Trunk Road T2 and Tseung Kwan O - Lam Tin Tunnel. It will connect West Kowloon, Kowloon East and Tseung Kwan O.

See also 
Architecture of Hong Kong
Civil Engineering and Development Department
Kai Tak Airport
RAF Kai Tak

References

External links
Kai Tak Development, Kai Tak Office, Civil Engineering and Development Department
Kai Tak Development,30 January 2013, Civil Engineering and Development Department

 
Kowloon City District
Kowloon Bay
New Kowloon
Victoria Harbour